D'Algy is a surname. Notable people with the surname include:

 Helena D'Algy (1906–after 1991), Portuguese film actress
 Tony D'Algy (1897–1977), Portuguese film actor, brother of Helena

See also
 Algy